David Bernard McFall  (12 December 1919 – 18 September 1988) was a Scottish sculptor.

Born in Glasgow, McFall studied at the Junior School of Arts and Crafts in Birmingham from 1931 to 1934, and at the Birmingham School of Art from 1934 to 1939. In 1939 he worked as an assistant to Eric Gill, before studying at the Royal College of Art in London from 1940 to 1941, and at the City and Guilds of London Art School from 1941 to 1945. He worked with Jacob Epstein from 1944 until 1958, returning to the City and Guilds School in Kennington to teach from 1956.

Notable works include The Bull Calf (Portland Stone), which was selected for the Royal Academy Summer Exhibition and bought for the Tate in 1942 while the sculptor was still a student; Boy and Horse (Stone), which featured in the Dome of Discovery at the Festival of Britain; the black horse mural outside Blackhorse Road station; and a major statue of Winston Churchill.

He was elected an Associate of the Royal Academy in 1955 and a full member in 1963.

References

External links
David McFall R.A. (1919–1988) Tribute website
 Profile on Royal Academy of Arts Collections

1919 births
1988 deaths
Scottish sculptors
Scottish male sculptors
Artists from Glasgow
Artists from Birmingham, West Midlands
Alumni of the Royal College of Art
Royal Academicians
20th-century British sculptors
Alumni of the Birmingham School of Art